Two ships in the United States Navy have been named USS Tallapoosa for the Tallapoosa River.

  was a steamship during the American Civil War.
  was a United States Coast Guard cutter built in 1915 and taken in the Navy during World War I.

United States Navy ship names